Wright Mahdi Bray (born "Wright Bray" January 9, 1950), is a Muslim American civil and human rights activist and currently the National Director of the American Muslim Alliance and formerly served as executive director of the Muslim American Society's Freedom Foundation (MAS Freedom) based in Washington, DC. The foundation supported Muslim activists and religious leaders who have been arrested.

Political activism
Bray used to be political director of the Muslim Public Affairs Council (MPAC).

Bray has expressed support for Hamas and Hezbollah on a number of occasions.  A video of a rally in 2000 shows Bray  pumping his fist in the air in support of the groups Hamas and Hezbollah.  He asserts, however, that he is not a supporter of Hamas.

In 2001 Bray served as a liaison with United States President George W. Bush's White House Faith-Based Initiative Program, which he later opposed. After the September 11 attacks, he and other Muslim leaders met with then-U.S. Attorney General John Ashcroft. He also served as a congressional affairs representative on behalf of the Muslim community.

Bray served on the board of directors of the Interfaith Alliance and the National Interfaith Committee for Worker Justice, and is a National Co-convener of Religions for Peace-USA. He is a Washington, DC, television and radio talk show host, and has appeared on CBS News, Fox, MSNBC, CNN, C-SPAN, Aljazeera, and many TV and radio talk shows. Bray also organized protests against the U.S. war in Afghanistan, the Iraq war, and the Israeli occupation of the West Bank and Gaza.

References

External links
 Mahdi Bray's personal website
 
 
 Shadow World: Resurgent Russia, the Global New Left, and Radical Islam, Muslim Public Affairs Council, pp. 499–500, Robert Chandler, Regnery Publishing, 2008, 

1950 births
Living people
Converts to Islam
African-American Muslims
American activists
American Muslim activists